This list of Fuller Theological Seminary people includes notable current and former faculty of Fuller Theological Seminary as well as alumni of the institution.

Faculty

David Augsburger, Professor Emeritus of Pastoral Care and Counseling (1990–2018), Anabaptist author
Warren S. Brown, director of the Lee Edward Travis Research Institute and Professor of Psychology in the School of Psychology; principal editor and contributor to Whatever Happened to the Soul?: Scientific and Theological Portraits of Human Nature (1998); editor and contributor to Understanding Wisdom: Sources, Science and Society (2000)
William Dyrness, Dean of the School of Theology 1990–2000, professor of theology and culture
Joel B. Green, Associate Dean for the Center for Advanced Theological Studies and Professor of New Testament Interpretation
Seyoon Kim, Professor of New Testament and former Associate Dean for Korean Doctor of Ministry Program
Veli-Matti Kärkkäinen, Professor of Systematic Theology
Nancey Murphy, philosopher of science and Christian theologian, known for her works on religion and science, author of Theology in the Age of Scientific Reasoning, winner of prizes from the American Academy of Religion and the Templeton Foundation

Former faculty

Gleason Archer, influential Biblical scholar and theologian; taught at Fuller 1948–65
Justin L. Barrett, Director of the Thrive Center for Human Development, Thrive Professor of Developmental Science, and Professor of Psychology
Edward John Carnell (1919–1967), author of Introduction to Christian Apologetics, A Philosophy of the Christian Religion, and many other books; seminary President, 1954–59
 Chapman "Chap" Clark, Associate Provost of Strategic Projects and Professor of Youth, Family and Culture; taught DMin courses in Youth, Family and Culture; author of numerous books on youth ministry
Oliver D. Crisp, Professor of Systematic Theology; expert in philosophical theology
Richard J. Foster, former Fuller professor, theologian; author of Celebration of Discipline, named by Christianity Today as one of the "100 Best Religious Books of the 20th Century"
John Goldingay, David Allan Hubbard Professor of Old Testament
Paul King Jewett, Professor of Systematic Theology
Charles H. Kraft, linguist and anthropologist; proponent of the Third Wave of the Holy Spirit Movement; Sun-Hee Kwak Professor of Anthropology and Intercultural Communication at Fuller
William Sanford La Sor, professor of the Old Testament
George Eldon Ladd, professor of New Testament exegesis and theology; during a time when dispensationalism held sway over evangelicalism, Ladd was a proponent of the Historic Premillennialist perspective and the "already/not yet" concept of the Kingdom of God
Joy J. Moore, Professor of Biblical Preaching and Academic Dean at Luther Seminary in St. Paul, Minnesota.
Richard Mouw, influential Christian philosopher, ethicist, author, President of Fuller (1993–2013)
Richard Muller, professor of Church History/Historical Theology; Calvin and Post-Reformation scholar; teaches at Calvin Theological Seminary
J. Edwin Orr (1912–1987), professor of missiology, and authority on European and American Protestant Revival movements and history
Robert N. Schaper (1922–2007), former Dean of the Chapel and Arthur DeKruyter/Christ Church Oak Brook Professor of Preaching and Practical Theology
Lewis B. Smedes (1921–2002), influential theologian and writer; author of Forgive and Forget; former Professor of Theology and Ethics who taught at Fuller for twenty-five years
Glen Stassen (1936–2014), Christian ethicist, son of Harold Stassen, former Lewis B. Smedes Professor of Christian Ethics at Fuller
Thomas Talbott, professor of philosophy at Willamette University who is controversial in theological circles for his vigorous defense of the doctrine of Christian universal salvation; taught at Fuller for three years early in his career
Miroslav Volf, influential theologian; Henry B. Wright Professor of Systematic Theology at Yale Divinity School; author of Exclusion and Embrace, named by Christianity Today as one of the 100 most important religion books of the 20th century; taught at Fuller 1991–1998
C. Peter Wagner, former professor of Church Growth at Fuller Theological Seminary, coined the term "Third Wave;" founder of Global Harvest Ministries, co-founder of the World Prayer Center
Neil Clark Warren, former dean of the School of Psychology, founder of eHarmony
Mel White, former Professor of Communications and Preaching; infamous within Evangelical Christianity due to his sexuality and ministry to homosexuals following his departure from the Evangelical Protestant movement
John Wimber, pastor, founder of the Vineyard Movement; directed the Charles E. Fuller Institute of Evangelism and Church Growth 1974–1978, later served as an adjunct professor at Fuller
Charles Woodbridge, one of the original recruits for the founding faculty, joined in 1950, resigned in 1957 over neo-evangelicalist leanings; president of the Evangelical Theological Society

Alumni
 Patrick Kakule Butsapu (MA in Intercultural Studies), Development Practitioner and Pastor in Paris, France 
 Abraham Thottumkal Pothen (PhD), Doulos Theological Seminary, Kerala, India
Aleyamma Pothen (D.Min), Doulos Theological Seminary, Kerala, India
Augustin Ahimana, bishop of Kivu
 Leith Anderson (D.Min), president of National Association of Evangelicals
 Keith Andrews (D.Min.), bishop of the Diocese of Western Anglicans
 Rob Bell (M.Div), author of Velvet Elvis and Love Wins, founding pastor of Mars Hill Bible Church
 James Brenneman (M.Div), President of Goshen College
 Bill Bright (B.D), founder of Campus Crusade for Christ
 Monty Burnham (M.Div and D.Min), Young Life Staff, Adjunct Professor at Fuller, Pastor of four Presbyterian Churches (USA), Field Staff of CRU's Executive Ministries
 Alexander Chow (M.A.), Senior Lecturer in Theology and World Christianity at New College, University of Edinburgh
 Samuel Chu (M. Div.), founding executive director of California Faith for Equality, President of One LA-Industrial Areas Foundation, Fellow at Center for Religion and Civic Culture at University of Southern California
 Nancy L. DeClaisse-Walford (M.A.), the Carolyn Ward Professor of Old Testament and Biblical Languages at McAfee School of Theology of Mercer University
 Craig Detweiler (M.Div., Ph.D.), filmmaker, author, cultural commentator, professor at Pepperdine University
 Robert Grant, founder of the Christian Voice organization
 Timothy Headington, businessman, film producer, real estate developer
 Jamal-Dominique Hopkins, Associate Professor of Christian Scriptures at Baylor University's Truett Theological Seminary and former founding Dean of Dickerson-Green Theological Seminary at Allen University
 Gregory C. Horn, US Navy rear admiral
 Willie James Jennings, associate professor of systematic theology and Africana studies at Yale Divinity School
 Jin Mingri, also known as Ezra Jin, he is the pastor of Zion Church of Beijing in China. He received a DMin degree.
 Veli-Matti Kärkkäinen (M.A.), author, Finnish theologian, Professor of Systematic Theology at Fuller Theological Seminary 
 Joon Gon Kim, founder of Korea Campus Crusade for Christ
 Tom Lin (M.A.), the current president of InterVarsity Christian Fellowship and the first non-white president
 John C. Maxwell (D.Min), evangelical Christian author, speaker, and pastor who has written more than 50 books, primarily focusing on leadership
 John Ortberg, teaching pastor of Menlo Park Presbyterian Church, and author of several books including The Life You've Always Wanted and If You Want to Walk on Water, You've Got to Get Out of the Boat
 Les Parrott III, Ph.D., professor of clinical psychology for Seattle Pacific University, author, and motivational speaker
 John D. Robb, Chairman of the International Prayer Council
 Thomas R. Schreiner (Ph.D.), author, New Testament scholar, James Buchanan Harrison Professor of New Testament Interpretation at the Southern Baptist Theological Seminary 
 Robert A. Schuller (M.Div.), Senior Pastor in the Crystal Cathedral and the Hour of Power; author; Robert Schuller Ministries
 Todd H. Speidell (M.Div., Ph.D.), theologian and author
 David H. Stern (M.Div), Messianic Jewish theologian and author; his books include Jewish New Testament Commentary and Messianic Judaism (original title Messianic Jewish Manifesto)
 Miroslav Volf (M.A.), influential theologian, Yale Divinity School professor, director of the Yale Center for Culture and Faith
 Bruce A. Ware (Ph.D.), author, Professor of Christian Theology at the Southern Baptist Theological Seminary
 Rick Warren (D.Min), pastor of Saddleback Church, author of The Purpose Driven Church and the best-selling hardback book in US publishing history, The Purpose Driven Life
 James White, Director of Alpha and Omega Ministries
 Carl W. Wilson M.Div., Th.M., author, pastor, educator; inaugural director of Campus Crusade for Christ international high school ministry; founder of World Wide Discipleship Association; author of many books, including the classic With Christ in the School of Disciple Building
 Anthony C. Yu (S.T.B.), religion and literary scholar, translator of Journey to the West, professor at the University of Chicago

References

Fuller Theological Seminary people
Fuller Theological Seminary